Whitman is an unincorporated community in Rollingstone Township, Winona County, Minnesota, United States.

Notes

Unincorporated communities in Winona County, Minnesota
Unincorporated communities in Minnesota